Sláine ingen Briain was the daughter of Brian Boru, High King of Ireland, and wife of Sigtrygg Silkbeard, King of Dublin. 
Sláine was married to Sigtrygg after his defeat at Glen Máma in 999 to unite Dublin and Munster forces following a failed rebellion by Sigtrygg and others. 
They had one son, Olaf Sigtryggsson. 
The most well known reference to Sláine is in the Cogadh Gáedhel re Galliabh.

Although only referred to as daughter of Brian and wife of Amlaibh's son in the Cogadh, her attributed words in the Cogadh are jabs at Sigtrygg and his allies.

Sigtrygg died in 1042, but the date of his wife's death is not known.

References

 

Year of death unknown
10th-century Irish people
11th-century Irish people
People from County Clare
Year of birth unknown
10th-century Irish women
11th-century Irish women